Podkamennaya Tunguska Airport  is an airport serving the Podkamennaya Tunguska and Bor villages in Turukhansky District, Krasnoyarsk Krai, Russia.

Airlines and destinations

References

Airports built in the Soviet Union
Airports in Krasnoyarsk Krai
Turukhansky District